Dương Trương Thiên Lý (born 16 July 1989) is a Vietnamese actress, director, model and beauty pageant titleholder. Accordingly, she gained  placement as 2nd runner-up in Miss Universe Vietnam 2008, and represented Vietnam in the Miss World 2008 pageant in South Africa.

Thien Ly is the National Director of Miss Universe in Vietnam.

Biography
Although placing 2nd runner-up in Miss Universe Vietnam 2008, Thiên Lý won Miss Photogenic in Miss Universe Vietnam 2008.

Thiên Lý was chosen to represent Vietnam in Miss World 2008 after the winner of Miss Vietnam 2008, Trần Thị Thùy Dung, was not allowed to represent Vietnam in international competitions because she had not graduated from high school, and the winner of Miss Universe Vietnam opted to continue her studies instead of competing.

Thiên Lý was informed that she had qualified for Miss World 2008 in late November, and therefore had little time to prepare. She was unable to reach the semifinals. However, she won the title of People's Choice in the Miss World 2008 pageant. She later became the national director for Miss Vietnam Universe 2009 Võ Hoàng Yến, helping her prepare for Miss Universe.

In 2009, she was also chosen as the Promotional Ambassador for the last Asian Indoor Games held in Vietnam.

Also in 2009, she was selected to participate in a movie called "Trần Thủ Độ". However, she later resigned because she did not want to hurt her image due to some inappropriate scenes she would have to play in the movie.

She studied at Saint Mary University, United States.

2013, Lý became the National Director of Miss Universe in Vietnam.

See also
List of Miss World Special Awards

References

External links

1989 births
Living people
Miss World 2008 delegates
Vietnamese female models
Vietnamese beauty pageant winners
21st-century Vietnamese women